Emmet Mullins (born 1989/90) is an Irish National Hunt trainer and former jockey based in County Carlow.

Background and career as a jockey

Mullins comes from a racing background. His father, George Mullins, was an amateur jockey and set up a racehorse transport business. His uncle is trainer Willie Mullins. During a career as a jockey from the 2006-07 season to the 2014–15 season, Mullins rode a total of 83 winners, including seven Grade 2 and 3 winners. He rode a winner at the Cheltenham Festival on Sir Des Champs in the Martin Pipe Conditional Jockeys' Handicap Hurdle in 2011. Another notable success came with his only ride on Faugheen when they won the Dorans Pride Novice Hurdle at Limerick in December 2013.

Career as a trainer

Mullins obtained his trainer's licence in 2016 and set up a yard close to his uncle at Muine Bheag, County Carlow. He saddled his first Cheltenham Festival winner in 2021, when The Shunter won the Plate Handicap Chase. In 2022 he saddled the winner of the Grand National, Noble Yeats, ridden by the owner's son Sam Waley-Cohen.

Racecourse ban

In June 2020 Mullins was fined €5,000 by the Irish Horse Racing Regulatory Board and banned from racecourses for three months after he contravened Covid-19 protocols at Leopardstown Racecourse.

Cheltenham winners (as jockey)

Martin Pipe Conditional Jockeys' Handicap Hurdle - (1) Sir Des Champs (2011)

Cheltenham winners (as trainer)

Plate Handicap Chase - (1) The Shunter (2021)

Other major wins

 Great Britain

 Grand National - (1) Noble Yeats (2022)

References

Living people
Irish racehorse trainers
Irish jockeys
Year of birth missing (living people)